Luqman (also known as Luqman the Wise or Luqman al-Hakim) was a wise man after whom Surah Luqman, the 31st sura (chapter) of the Quran, was named. Luqman ( BC) is believed to have been from Nubia Egypt. There are many stories about Luqman in Persian, Arabic and Turkish literature, with the primary historical sources for his life being Tafsir ibn Kathir and Stories of the Prophets by Ibn Kathir. While the Quran does not state whether Luqman was a prophet or not, some believe him to be a prophet and thus, add the honorific ʿAlaihis Salam (A.S.) after his name.

Source of Luqman's wisdom

According to the 12th ayah (verse) of Surah Luqman in the Qur'an, Luqman was bestowed with wisdom by God, al-Hakim (the Most Wise).

According to a Hadith in the Muwatta of Imam Malik, Luqman was asked, "What has brought you to what we see?", referring to his high rank. Luqman said, "Truthful speech, fulfilling the trust, and leaving what does not concern me." This narration has also been mentioned with different wording in another source from ibn Jarir who heard it from ibn Hamid who heard it from al-Hakam who heard it from Umar ibn Qais. 

In another Hadith, it is mentioned that for some people, a high rank in Jannah has been determined. However, when that person has not acquired the good deeds to reach that high rank, God causes him to receive some trials or tests, which, if accepted and borne patiently, will grant him a high status.

Slavery of Luqman Al- Hakim

Luqman was captured by slavers and sold as a slave. He was deprived of his freedom and could neither move nor speak freely. However, he suffered his bondage patiently, faithfully, and hopefully, waiting for God's action. This was the first of the trials that he had to bear.

The man who bought Luqman was good-hearted and intelligent, treating Luqman with kindness. He was able to detect that Luqman was not ordinary and thus, tried to test his intelligence and discovered its reality.

One day, the man ordered Luqman to slaughter a sheep and Luqman slaughtered the sheep. Then, he ordered Luqman to bring its best parts to him and Luqman took its heart and tongue to his master. On receiving them, his master smiled, fascinated by Luqman's choice of the 'best' part of the sheep. He understood that Luqman was trying to convey some deep meaning, even though he could not determine exactly what. From that moment onwards, his owner began to take more interest in Luqman and became kinder to him than before. 

A few days later, Luqman was again instructed to slaughter a sheep - which he did - but this time he was asked to take the worst parts of the animal to his master. Once again, Luqman brought the heart and the tongue - to his master's amazement. When the master mentioned this to Luqman, the wise Luqman answered, "The tongue and the heart are the sweetest parts if they are good, and nothing can be worse than these if they are wicked!" after that, Luqman's owner held him in great respect. Many people consulted Luqman for advice, and the fame of his wisdom spread all over the country. Such was the knowledge of Luqman Al-Hakim.

Identity of Luqman
An Arabian mythical figure named 'Luqman' also existed long before the figure of the wise 'Luqman' appeared in the Quran, resulting in considerable debate of both theological and historical nature as to the relationship of the two characters.

Some, such as 17th-century French scholar Pierre-Daniel Huet, maintain that the two are the same person, but others argue that they simply share the same name. In Arabic proverb collections, the two characters are fused, drawing from both the Quran and pre-Islamic stories, endowing Luqman with superhuman strength and lifespan. The pre-Islamic Luqman was of the Ad people, who lived in Al-Ahqaf in the Arabian peninsula, near modern-day Yemen.

References

Further reading
 Barham, Francis Foster Lokman's Arabic Fables, literally translated into English (word for word), Bath, 1869, 12mo.

External links
 
 
 FABULAS DE LUQMAN POR M. CHARBONNEAU. PARIS . HACHETTE, 1846
 Fables de Loqman le Sage; le texte rev. de nouveau sur les mss., accompagné d'une version française et des notes, et précédé d'une introduction sur la personne de Loqman et sur l'origine de ce recueil de fables (1850)

People of the Quran
Angelic visionaries
Islamic mythology
Wisdom